James Leslie Wanklyn (14 April 1860 – 6 July 1919) was a Liberal Unionist Member of Parliament for Bradford Central, elected at the 1895 general election and again at the following general election in 1900. He did not stand at the 1906 election.

Biography
Wanklyn was born in 1860 in Holdenhurst, Hampshire, to James Hibbert Wanklyn and Elizabeth Wanklyn (née Leslie).

Wanklyn had numerous sporting interests. He was a member of the Marylebone Cricket Club, for whom he played one first-class match in 1885, and an early leading member, from its inception in 1894, of the Ranelagh Club, noted as a polo and golf centre.

He died on 6 July 1919 in Northampton.

Family
In August 1898, he married Laura Mary Stapylton (her first husband, Huntly Bacon, died in June 1897).

References

External links
 

1860 births
1919 deaths
Liberal Unionist Party MPs for English constituencies
Marylebone Cricket Club cricketers
UK MPs 1895–1900
UK MPs 1900–1906
Politicians from Bradford
English cricketers